Nojian Waterfall (in Lurish called:آوشار نوژیو) is one of the highest waterfalls in Iran. It is located in Khorramabad County in lorestan Province, in the west of Iran.

Nozhian Waterfall was included on the Natural Heritage list by Cultural Heritage, Handicrafts and Tourism Organization of Iran on 27 March 2008.

Description
The Forest Resort of Nojian is located on the top of the Taff Mountains. There are many medicinal herbs growing in the Taff Mountains, with a large range of wild plants. Many visitors come to the area to see the waterfall and collect medicinal plants. The route to Nojian is from Khorramabad on the Nojian asphalted road, or by railway to the country station and after that, about two hours hiking is required to reach the waterfall.

References 

Waterfalls of Iran
Landforms of Lorestan Province
Khorramabad County
Tourist attractions in Khorramabad
Waterfalls of Lorestan Province